The Perimeter Road, also known as the Margaret River Perimeter Road, is a highway bypass of Margaret River, Western Australia. The  road deviates Bussell Highway traffic, including heavy vehicles, to the east of the town, and connects to a new airport access road. It is planned to eventually be a dual carriageway, but has initially been constructed as a single carriageway, in two stages. Construction of stage one, from south of Margaret River to Rosa Brook Road, began in December 2014 and was completed in May 2015. Construction of stage two – the remaining northern section – began in September 2017 and was completed in February 2019, with an opening in December 2018. An extension of John Archibald Drive and the redevelopment of Bussell Highway in the town were included in the business case for constructing stage two.

Stage two of the project received $60 million of funding from The Nationals Western Australia to enable a complete bypass to be constructed, rather than a "road to nowhere". The state government provided the $13 million to construct stage one. The total cost was $47.6 million.

The project underwent an Environmental Impact Assessment and Aboriginal Heritage survey. Action was taken to compensate for the loss of native vegetation, and a zoologist was employed to identify and relocate native fauna at the start of stage one construction.

The perimeter road has been designed to reduce congestion, improve safety for the many pedestrians, including tourists, who use the road, and provide heavy vehicles with a lesser gradient to ascend or descend.

References

Highways in rural Western Australia
Margaret River, Western Australia